Freeport is an unincorporated community in Wirt County, West Virginia, United States. It is located along Route 47 (Old Staunton Turnpike), approximately four miles east of the Wood County line and two miles west of the Ritchie County line. Its elevation is 607 feet (185m)

References

Unincorporated communities in Wirt County, West Virginia
Unincorporated communities in West Virginia